Disney, previously credited as V. K. Gnanasekar, is an Indian film director, who has directed Tamil language films. He became known for the thriller drama Naan Sivanagiren (2011), and has gone on to make feature films including Irumbu Manithan (2020) and Kuttram Purindhaal (2023).

Career
Disney, then credited as V. K. Gnanasekar, made his directorial debut through the thriller drama Naan Sivanagiren (2011) featuring newcomers. He worked on the story, screenplay, dialogues and lyrics for the film. The film opened to negative reviews, with a reviewer from entertainment portal Behindwoods noting "everything about the film is on a mediocre level. The story and screenplay are complete let downs. The camera work is highly inconsistent and the music is just passable. It is one of those movies which make you restless right from the start to finish." Critic Rohit Ramachandran of NowRunning wrote "Naan Sivanagiren is a deformed offspring produced by the interbreeding of Katradhu Thamizh and Anniyan", concluding it was a "feeble effort".

Disney then began work on Kuttram Purinthal, but its production delay meant that his next release was Irumbu Manithan (2020) starring Santhosh Prathap. The film opened to moxed reviews, with The Times of India giving the film 1.5 stars out of five stars. In contrast, the critic from Dina Thanthi praised the acting, direction, and story.

Filmography
Films

References

External links

Living people
Tamil film directors
Film directors from Tamil Nadu
Year of birth missing (living people)
21st-century Indian film directors
Tamil screenwriters